Cloverport is a home rule-class city in Breckinridge County, Kentucky, United States, on the banks of the Ohio River. The population was 1,152 at the 2010 census.

History
The town was once known as Joesville after its founder, Joe Huston.  Established around 1798 (or possibly 1808) on the east side of where Clover Creek meets the Ohio River.  The town was the site of the ferry where, in 1816, Jacob Weatherholt piloted the family of Abraham Lincoln, then seven, across the Ohio River on its way to a newly acquired farm in Spencer County, Indiana.

The town was renamed Cloverport in 1828 after nearby Clover Creek.  Seven years before, in 1821, the Kentucky Legislature had built a toll road between the town and Bowling Green.  1828 also saw the town open a post office with George LaHeist as post master.

The town was the site of a button factory, which made use of mussel shells from the Ohio. In the nineteenth century, the Victoria Coal Mines (named in honor of the British queen) produced coal oil from cannel coal that was used to light Buckingham Palace.

The town was formally incorporated by an act of the state assembly in 1860 and expanded to take in the growing number of homes on the west side of Clover Creek.

The town had its own newspaper beginning on July 17, 1878.  The Breckenridge News was started by John D. Babbage and run by his family until 1950 when it was sold to George and Edith Wilson.  The Wilsons merged the paper with their other newspaper, the Irvington Herald, and formed the Breckinridge County Herald-News in 1956.

In 1892 Cloverport became the home of the maintenance shops for the Louisville, Henderson, and St. Louis Railroad.  The town raised $20,000 to bring the shops and donated ten acres for the location.  The shops employed two hundred men at one time.  The shop burned down on March 13, 1916 but was rebuilt.  The shops stayed open until 1929 when the Louisville, Henderson and St. Louis was bought out by the Louisville and Nashville Railroad.  The city and railroad company went to federal court in Louisville with the city trying to force the shops to stay open or for the railroad to pay the city back the original $20,000 that was raised for the shops plus $30,000 in interest.  The dispute was settled out of court with the railroad paying back the original $20,000 plus returning the ten acres of land to the city.  The city turned the land into an athletic park and a waste treatment facility.

Former United States Supreme Court Justice Wiley Blount Rutledge was born at nearby Tar Springs on July 20, 1894. Rutledge was the son of the pastor of Cloverport's Baptist church.

On March 13, 1901 a fire swept through the city leaving about half of the residents homeless and destroying almost all of the business buildings, including two full American Tobacco Company warehouses.  Damage was estimated to be over $500,000.

In 1903, The Murray Roofing Tile Company started a tile plant in the city.  In 1959 the company merged with other companies to form the Ceramic Tile Division of National Gypsum.  This division then became known as American Olean Tile Company.

Another fire struck Cloverport on March 14, 1910 and destroyed many homes on the east side of town.  At the time, the closest fire truck was in Owensboro and men from the Louisville, Henderson, and St. Louis Railroad repair yard were credited with saving many homes.

In 2003, the National Park Service transferred the Cloverport Access Site to the city so that a community riverfront park could be developed.  The property included the boat ramp on Clover Creek and 15.7 acres of property.

Flooding
Being a river town, Cloverport has been subjected to several floods since its founding.  The Ohio River Flood of 1884 had been what all other floods which have struck the city were compared to until 1937.  A flood in January 1907 crested at two feet below the 1884 high water mark.  The city was also struck by the Great Flood of 1913.  The Phelps' Button factory flooded leaving many out of work and many other families were forced to leave their homes.  It was reported that the flood waters were seven feet over the Tar Fork bridge and neck deep on a horse at Hites Run.  All of the homes across the river in Tobinsport, Indiana were under water.  The Ohio River flood of 1937 saw seventy percent of the town's residents hit by the flood waters.  The crest of the flood at the downstream Cannelton Locks and Dam was measured at 60.8 feet.  This is over six feet higher than the next highest flood, which was the 1945 flood that crested at 54.4 feet.  Cloverport was also hit by large floods in 1997, 2011, and 2018.

Historic sites
 Cloverport Historic District, comprises most of the old downtown business district
 Oglesby-Conrad House, on U.S. 60
 Fisher Homestead on U.S. 60
 Skillman House on Tile Plant Road

Geography

Demographics

As of the census of 2000, there were 1,256 people, 536 households, and 351 families residing in the city. The racial makeup of the city was 96.42% White, 2.47% African American, 0.08% Asian, 0.08% from other races, and 0.96% from two or more races. Hispanic or Latino of any race were 0.88% of the population.

There were 536 households, out of which 23.9% had children under the age of 18 living with them, 47.6% were married couples living together, 14.0% had a female householder with no husband present, and 34.5% were non-families. 32.3% of all households were made up of individuals, and 16.8% had someone living alone who was 65 years of age or older. The average household size was 2.27 and the average family size was 2.83.

In the city, the population was spread out, with 20.8% under the age of 18, 8.9% from 18 to 24, 23.6% from 25 to 44, 27.4% from 45 to 64, and 19.3% who were 65 years of age or older. The median age was 43 years. For every 100 females, there were 95.9 males. For every 100 females age 18 and over, there were 89.5 males.

The median income for a household in the city was $23,750, and the median income for a family was $30,917. Males had a median income of $30,156 versus $18,750 for females. The per capita income for the city was $14,990. About 14.1% of families and 20.2% of the population were below the poverty line, including 27.9% of those under age 18 and 13.3% of those age 65 or over.

Education
Students in Cloverport attend Cloverport Independent Schools.

Cloverport High---1930 Class A 2nd-Region Boys Champs and 1932 6th-Region Boys Champs.

Cloverport has a public library, a branch of the Breckinridge County Public Library.

Notable people
 Joseph Seamon Cotter Sr., poet, writer, playwright, and community leader
 Dora Dean, vaudeville dancer
 James W. Flanagan, Lieutenant Governor of Texas
 Rice E. Graves, Confederate artillery officer
 Virginia Cary Hudson, New York Times best selling author
 Joseph Holt, Commissioner of Patents, Postmaster General and Secretary of War in President Buchanan's administration, 1857-1861
 Benjamin Franklin Mudge, first State Geologist of Kansas
 Eli Houston Murray, Governor of the Utah Territory
 Wiley Blount Rutledge, former United States Supreme Court jurist

See also
 List of cities in Kentucky
 List of cities and towns along the Ohio River

References

External links

 

Populated places established in 1808
Cities in Breckinridge County, Kentucky
Cities in Kentucky
Kentucky populated places on the Ohio River